The Kabaddi Federation of Uganda (KFU) is the governing body  of Kabaddi in Uganda.Kabaddi, is a contact sport, native to the Indian subcontinent.
The Kabaddi Federation of Uganda was founded in 2017 and its affiliated to International Kabaddi Federation since 2017. It organises both the men as well the women's national Kabaddi team and organises the Uganda Kabaddi League.

Location
The Kabaddi Federation of Uganda headquarters is located on Plot 12/16, Mapeera road, Nalukolongo, Rubaga Division in Kampala District.

Organisation
In February 2019, the National Council Of Uganda certified the Kabaddi Federation of Uganda as one of the sports in the country.

Competition
In November 2019, Uganda Kabaddi team competited in the Junior World Kabaddi Championship which took place in Iran.

References

External links
 Official Website

International sports organizations
Sports organisations of Uganda
Sports organizations established in 2017
2017 establishments in Uganda